MENA, an acronym in the English language, refers to a grouping of countries situated in and around the Middle East and North Africa. It is also known as WANA, SWANA, or NAWA, which alternatively refers to the Middle East as Western Asia (or as "Southwestern Asia" in the case of "SWANA") and is a way to refer to the geography instead of the political term.

As a regional identifier, MENA is often used in academia, military planning, disaster relief, media planning (as a broadcast region), and business writing. Moreover, the region shares a number of cultural, economic, and environmental similarities across its comprising countries; for example, some of the most extreme impacts of climate change will be felt in MENA.

Some terms have a wider definition than MENA, such as MENASA, MENAP or Greater Middle East, which extends to Central and South Asia to include the countries of Afghanistan and Pakistan. The term MENAT explicitly includes Turkey, which is usually excluded from some MENA definitions, even though Turkey is almost always considered part of the Middle East.

Definitions 
"MENA" has no standardized definition; different organizations define the region as consisting of different territories, or do not define it as a region at all.

United Nations 

There is no MENA region amongst the United Nations Regional Groups, nor in the United Nations geoscheme used by the UNSD (though the latter does feature two subregions called 'Western Asia' and 'Northern Africa', see WANA). Some agencies and programmes of the United Nations do define the MENA region, but their definitions may contradict each other, and sometimes only apply to specific studies or reports.
 A 2003 World Bank study stated: "In World Bank geographic classification, the following 21 countries or territories constitute the Middle East and North Africa (MENA) region: six Gulf Cooperation Council (GCC) members (Bahrain, Kuwait, Oman, Qatar, Saudi Arabia, and United Arab Emirates [UAE]), and 15 other countries or territories: Algeria, Djibouti, the Arab Republic of Egypt, Iraq, the Islamic Republic of Iran, Israel, Jordan, Lebanon, Libya, Malta, Morocco, the Republic of Yemen, the Syrian Arab Republic, Tunisia, and West Bank and Gaza." As of January 2021, the World Bank website groups the same set of 21 countries/territories as MENA: "Algeria; Bahrain; Djibouti; Egypt, Arab Rep.; Iran, Islamic Rep.; Iraq; Israel; Jordan; Kuwait; Lebanon; Libya; Malta; Morocco; Oman; Qatar; Saudi Arabia; Syrian Arab Republic; Tunisia; United Arab Emirates; West Bank and Gaza; Yemen, Rep..".
 A 2010 UNHCR report stated: "For the purposes of this study, the MENA region has been defined as  the following 18 countries: Algeria, Bahrain, Egypt, Iraq, Jordan, Kuwait, Lebanon, Libya, Mauritania, Morocco, Oman, Occupied Palestinian Territories, Qatar, Saudi Arabia, Syria, Tunisia, United Arab Emirates and Yemen."
 A 2015 FAO report stated: "The 21 MENA countries are Algeria, Bahrain, Djibouti, Egypt, Iran, Israel, Jordan, Kuwait, Lebanon, Libya, Malta, Morocco, Oman, Palestine, Qatar, Saudi Arabia, Syria, Tunisia, United Arab Emirates and Yemen."
 The UNAIDS regional classification of the Middle East and North Africa region "includes 20 countries/territories: Algeria, Bahrain, Djibouti, Egypt, Iran, Iraq, Jordan, Kuwait, Lebanon, Libya, Morocco, Oman, Qatar, Saudi Arabia, Somalia, Sudan, Syrian Arab Republic, Tunisia, United Arab Emirates and Yemen," according to a 2019 UNICEF report.
 As of January 2021, the UNICEF website groups the following set of 20 countries as MENA: "Algeria, Bahrain, Djibouti, Egypt, Iran (Islamic Republic of), Iraq, Jordan, Kuwait, Lebanon, Libya, Morocco, Oman, Qatar, Saudi Arabia, State of Palestine, Sudan, Syrian Arab Republic, Tunisia, United Arab Emirates, Yemen."
 Working for the International Monetary Fund (IMF), economists Hamid Reza Davoodi and George T. Abed wrote in 2003: "The MENA region comprises the Arab States in the Middle East and North Africa—Algeria, Bahrain, Djibouti, Egypt, Iraq, Jordan, Kuwait, Lebanon, Libya, Mauritania, Morocco, Oman, Qatar, Saudi Arabia, Somalia, Sudan, the Syrian Arab Republic, Tunisia, the United Arab Emirates, and Yemen—plus the Islamic State of Afghanistan, the Islamic Republic of Iran, Pakistan, the West Bank and Gaza." The authors emphasise that these "24 MENA countries (...) are grouped together for analytical purposes only." Although they allegedly "share common challenges and cultural links distinct from neighbouring economies" such as Israel and Turkey, and Islam is the dominant religion and Arabic the principal language, there are "sizable religious minority groups" and "significant linguistic diversities" in the MENA region, with Afghanistan, Iran and Pakistan not having Arabic as the majority language.

Other definitions 
Historians Michael Dumper and Bruce Stanley stated in 2007: 'For the purposes of this volume, the editors have generally chosen to define the MENA region as stretching from Morocco to Iran and from Turkey to the Horn of Africa. This definition thus includes the twenty-two countries of the Arab League (including the Palestinian Authority enclaves in the West Bank and Gaza Strip), Turkey, Israel, Iran, and Cyprus.' They stressed, however, how controversial and problematic this definition is, and that other choices could also have been made according to various criteria.

For its December 2012 global religion survey, the Pew Research Center grouped 20 countries and territories as 'the Middle East and North Africa', namely: 'Algeria, Bahrain, Egypt, Iraq, Israel, Jordan, Kuwait, Lebanon, Libya, Morocco, Oman, the Palestinian territories, Qatar, Saudi Arabia, Sudan, Syria, Tunisia, United Arab Emirates, Western Sahara and Yemen.'

For the Global Peace Index 2020, the Institute for Economics & Peace defined the MENA region as containing 20 countries: Algeria, Bahrain, Egypt, Iraq, Iran, Israel, Jordan, Kuwait, Lebanon, Libya, Morocco, Oman, Palestine, Qatar, Saudi Arabia, Sudan, Syria, Tunisia, United Arab Emirates, and Yemen.

WANA 

Due to the geographic ambiguity and Eurocentric nature of the term "Middle East", some people, especially in sciences such as agriculture and climatology, prefer to use other terms like "WANA" (West Asia and North Africa) or the less common NAWA (North Africa-West Asia). Usage of the term WANA has also been advanced by postcolonial studies.

The United Nations geoscheme used by the UNSD does not define a single WANA region, but it does feature two subregions called Western Asia, and Northern Africa, respectively:
 Western Asia (18): Armenia, Azerbaijan, Bahrain, Cyprus, Georgia, Iraq, Israel, Jordan, Kuwait, Lebanon, Oman, Qatar, Saudi Arabia, State of Palestine, Syrian Arab Republic, Turkey, United Arab Emirates, Yemen.
 Northern Africa (7): Algeria, Egypt, Libya, Morocco, Sudan, Tunisia, Western Sahara.

In a 1995 publication, the then-Aleppo-based International Center for Agricultural Research in the Dry Areas (ICARDA) defined its West Asia/North Africa (WANA) region as 25 countries, including: 'Afghanistan, Algeria, Egypt, Ethiopia, Iran, Iraq, Jordan, Lebanon, Libya, Morocco, Oman, Pakistan, Saudi Arabia, Sudan, Syria, Tunisia, Turkey and Yemen.' It noted that CGIAR's Technical Advisory Committee (TAC) excluded Ethiopia, Sudan and Pakistan from its 1992 WANA definition, but otherwise listed the same countries. In a 2011 study, ICARDA stated 27 countries/territories: 'The WANA region includes: Afghanistan, Algeria, Bahrain, Djibouti, Egypt, Eritrea, Ethiopia, Gaza Strip, Iran, Iraq, Jordan, Kuwait, Lebanon, Libya, Mauritania, Morocco, Oman, Pakistan, Qatar, Saudi Arabia, Somalia, Sudan, Syria, Tunisia, Turkey, United Arab Emirates, and Yemen.'

*Also called State of Palestine, or West Bank and Gaza (Strip).

Climate change

Culture

Human rights

Religion 

Islam is by far the dominant religion in nearly all of the MENA territories; 91.2% of the population is Muslim. The Middle East–North Africa region comprises 20 countries and territories with an estimated Muslim population of 315 million or about 23% of the world's Muslim population. The term "MENA" is often defined in part in relation to majority-Muslim countries located in the region, although several nations in the region are not Muslim-dominated. Major non-Islamic religions native here are Christianity, Judaism, Yazidism, Druzeism, African folk religions, Berberism and other Arab paganism.

Migrant population, mostly within the Gulf nations, practice mostly the beliefs they follow to, such as Buddhism and Hinduism among South Asian, East Asian and Southeast Asian migrants.

Demographics

Economy and education 

The MENA region has vast reserves of petroleum and natural gas that make it a vital source of global economic stability. According to the Oil and Gas Journal (January 1, 2009), the MENA region has 60% of the world's oil reserves and 45% of the world's natural gas reserves.

As of 2011, 8 of the 15 OPEC nations are within the MENA region.

According to Pew Research Center's 2016 "Religion and Education Around the World" study, 40% of the adult population in MENA had completed less than a year of primary school. The fraction was higher for women, of whom half had been to school for less than a year.

Politics

Stability and instability in the region 

In its Global Peace Index 2020, the Institute for Economics & Peace stated that 'the Middle East and North Africa remains the world's least peaceful region, despite improvements for 11 countries'. According to an in-depth multi-part study by the Center for Strategic and International Studies (CSIS) published in April 2016, the factors shaping the MENA region are exceedingly complex, and it is difficult to find 'any overall model that fits the different variables involved'. It found that there were 'deep structural causes of violence and instability'. Wars and upheavals are partly 'shaped by the major tribal, ethnic, sectarian, and regional differences', by 'demographic, economic, and security trends', and by 'quality of governance, internal security system, justice systems, and [social] progress.' In some countries, the necessary societal factors for successful democratic change (often championed by some in the region and in the West to address various issues) are absent, and political revolutions may not always lead to more stability, nor solve the underlying problems in a given MENA country. However, it also found that 'the majority of MENA nations have remained relatively stable and continue to make progress'.

Armed conflicts 

During and after the decolonisation of Africa and Asia in the 20th century, many different armed conflicts have occurred in the MENA region, including but not limited to the Rif War; the Iraqi–Kurdish conflict; the Arab–Israeli conflict; the Western Sahara conflict; the Lebanese Civil War; the Kurdish–Turkish conflict (1978–present); the Iranian Revolution; the Iran–Iraq War; Iran–Saudi Arabia proxy conflict; the Berber Spring; the Toyota War; the Invasion of Kuwait and the Gulf War; the Algerian Civil War; the Iraqi Kurdish Civil War; the rise of terrorism and anti-terrorist actions; the U.S.-led intervention of Iraq in 2003 and subsequent Iraq War. The Arab Spring (2010–2011) led to the Tunisian Revolution, the Egyptian revolution of 2011 and Egyptian Crisis (2011–2014), while also sparking war throughout the region such as the Syrian Civil War, the Libyan Civil War, the Yemeni Civil War and the Iraqi war against ISIS (Islamic State of Iraq and the Levant). During the Sudanese Revolution, months of protestes and a military coup led to the fall of Omar al-Bashir's regime and the initiation of the 2019–2022 Sudanese transition to democracy and the Sudanese peace process.

Related terms 
 Greater Middle East
In a preparatory working paper for the June 2004 G8 Summit, the U.S. government (at the end of the George W. Bush administration's first term) defined the 'Greater Middle East as including the Arab states, Israel, Turkey, Iran, Pakistan and Afghanistan.

 MENAP
From April 2013, the International Monetary Fund started using a new analytical region called MENAP (Middle East, North Africa, Afghanistan, and Pakistan), which adds Afghanistan and Pakistan to MENA countries.
Now MENAP is a prominent economic grouping in IMF reports.

 MENASA
MENASA refers to the Middle East, North Africa and South Asia region. Its usage consists of the region of MENA together with South Asia, with Dubai chosen by the United Nations as the data hub for the region. In some contexts, specifically the Lauder Institute at the University of Pennsylvania, the region is abbreviated as SAMENA instead of the more common MENASA.

 MENAT
The term MENAT (Middle East, North Africa, and Turkey) has been used to include Turkey in the list of MENA countries.

 Near East

The term Near East was commonly used before the term Middle East was coined by the British in the early 20th century. The term Ancient Near East is commonly used by scholars for the region in antiquity. Some organisations and scholars insist on still using 'Near East' today, with some including North Africa, but definitions range widely and there is no consensus on its geographical application.

EMME

EMME refers to an official grouping of 18 nations situated in and around the Eastern Mediterranean and Middle East. As a geographical and regional identifier, EMME is often used in academic settings, military planning, disaster relief, media, and business writing. Moreover, the diverse region shares a number of cultural, economic, and environmental similarities. The 18 nations in the Eastern Mediterranean and Middle East are: Bahrain, Cyprus, Egypt, Greece, Iran, Iraq, Israel, Jordan, Kuwait, Lebanon, Oman, Palestine, Qatar, Saudi Arabia, Syria, Turkey, UAE, and Yemen.

See also 
 Climate change in the Middle East and North Africa
 Demographics of the Middle East and North Africa
 Europe, the Middle East and Africa (EMEA)
 Eastern Mediterranean and Middle East (EMME)
 Fertile Crescent
 Gulf Cooperation Council (GCC)
 List of country groupings
 Middle East economic integration
 Near East
 Sahel
 Asia-Pacific
 Arab world

References

External links 
 

Acronyms
Economic country classifications
Middle East
North Africa
Regions of Eurasia